The Speed Reporter is a 1936 American crime film directed by Bernard B. Ray and starring Richard Talmadge, Luana Walters and Richard Cramer. It was produced as a second feature by the independent company Reliable Pictures.

Plot
In a crime-ridden city, a gangster moves to increase his control over the various illegal rackets, with the support of a corrupt editor of a newspaper. A cub reporter on a rival takes on the challenge to smash the mob.

Cast
 Richard Talmadge as Dick Lawrence
 Luana Walters as 	May
 Richard Cramer as Chuck Ballard, alias Brad Franklin
 Frank Hall Crane as Roger Renfrew
 Robert Walker as 	Stanley - City Editor 
 John Ince as Publisher Madison
 Earl Dwire as 	Publisher John Parker
 George Chesebro as Blackie Smith
 Ed Cassidy as 	Edwards, a Henchman
 James Sheridan as 	Henchman Gat 
 Victor Adamson as 	Henchman Butch 
 Eddie Davis as 	Jim - Press Reporter 
 William McCall as Hotel Doorman 
 Otto Metzetti as Henchman Chip 
 Victor Metzetti as 	Henchman Louie 
 Dorothy Vernon as Miss Edwards

References

Bibliography
 Langman, Larry. The Media in the Movies: A Catalog of American Journalism Films, 1900-1996. McFarland & Company, 1998.
 Pitts, Michael R. Poverty Row Studios, 1929–1940. McFarland & Company, 2005.

External links
 

1936 films
1936 crime films
American crime films
American black-and-white films
Films directed by Bernard B. Ray
Reliable Pictures films
1930s English-language films
1930s American films